The Devil's Harmony is a live action short film directed by Dylan Holmes Williams in 2019.

In 2020, it won the Jury Prize for International Fiction at Sundance Film Festival. In 2019, it won the Best UK Short Jury Prize at Raindance Film Festival, a Best Director award at Fantastic Fest and British / Irish Short Film of the Year at the London Film Critics Circle Awards. It was nominated for a British Independent Film Award (BIFA) for Best British Short Film.

The Devil's Harmony was produced by Nathan Craig (Tatata Studios), and distributed worldwide by the International Production & Distribution company Salaud Morisset.

Plot 
Revenge is best served a cappella. A bullied teenage girl leads a glee club on a trail of destruction against her high school enemies.

Awards 
Since its launch, the film has been selected in many festivals around the world.

References

External links 

Salaud Morisset, Short Films Production & Distribution
The Devil's Harmony (Full Film) on Vimeo

British short films
Sundance Film Festival award winners
2019 films
2019 short films
2010s English-language films